The Twenty-third Amendment of the Constitution of India, officially known as The Constitution (Twenty-third Amendment) Act, 1969, discontinued reservation of seats for the Scheduled Tribes in Nagaland, both in the Lok Sabha and the State Legislative Assembly and stipulated that not more than one Anglo-Indian could be nominated by the Governor to any State Legislative Assembly. Prior to the amendment, the number of Anglo-Indians who could be nominated to the State Legislative Assemblies, was left to the discretion of the Governor of the State. The amendment also extended the period of reservation of seats for the Scheduled Castes and Scheduled Tribes and representation of the Anglo-Indians in the Lok Sabha and the State Legislative Assemblies for another ten years, i.e. up to 26 January 1980.

Article 334 of the Constitution had originally required the reservation of seats to cease in 1960, but this was extended to 1970 by the 8th Amendment. The 23rd Amendment extended this period to 1980. The period of reservation was extended to 1990, 2000, 2010, 2020 and 2030 by the 45th, 62nd, 79th, 95th and 104th Amendments respectively.

Text

The full text of Articles 333 and 334, and clause(1) of Article 330, after the 23rd Amendment, are given below:

Proposal and enactment
The Constitution (Twenty-third Amendment) Bill, 1969 (Bill No. 78 of 1969) was introduced in the Lok Sabha on 21 August 1969 by Panampilly Govinda Menon, then Minister of Law. The Bill sought to amend articles 330, 332, 333 and 334 of the Constitution. The full text of the Statement of Objects and Reasons appended to the bill is given below:

The bill was debated by the Lok Sabha on 8 and 9 December, and passed in the original form on 9 December 1969. It was considered by the Rajya Sabha on 16 and 17 December, and passed on 17 December 1969. The bill, after ratification by the States, received assent from then President V. V. Giri on 23 January 1970. It was notified in The Gazette of India and came into force on 23 January 1970. It was notified in The Gazette of India on 26 January 1970.

Ratification
The Act was passed in accordance with the provisions of Article 368 of the Constitution, and was ratified by more than half of the State Legislatures, as required under Clause (2) of the said article. State Legislatures that ratified the amendment are listed below:

 Assam
 Kerala
 Madhya Pradesh
 Maharashtra
 Mysore
 Nagaland
 Punjab
 Rajasthan
 Tamil Nadu
 West Bengal

Did not ratify:
 Andhra Pradesh
 Bihar
 Gujarat
 Haryana
 Jammu and Kashmir
 Orissa
 Uttar Pradesh

See also 
 List of amendments of the Constitution of India

References

23
1969 in India
1969 in law
Indira Gandhi administration